A Cop Movie is a 2021 Mexican docudrama film directed by Alonso Ruizpalacios. The film stars Mónica Del Carmen and Raúl Briones.

The film had its worldwide premiere at the 71st Berlin International Film Festival in March 2021.

Cast
The cast include:
 Monica Del Carmen as Teresa
 Raul Briones as Montoya

Release
On February 11, 2021, Berlinale announced that the film would have its worldwide premiere at the 71st Berlin International Film Festival in the Berlinale Competition section, in March 2021.

Reception

References

External links
 
 

2021 films
2021 action films
2021 documentary films
Mexican action films
Mexican docudrama films
Mexican documentary films
2020s Spanish-language films
2020s Mexican films
Films about police officers
Films about police corruption